Clan na Gael Gaelic Athletic Club is a Gaelic Athletic Association club situated in the town of Lurgan, County Armagh, Northern Ireland. The club's pitch, Davitt Park, is named in honour of Michael Davitt, also the original club name. Throughout its 99-year history it has provided some of the most successful Gaelic footballers in Ireland.

The club will be celebrating its Centenary in 2022.

The club pursues the founding ideals of the GAA, namely the promotion of all things Gaelic - the Irish language, the culture, the games, the pastimes and the country. The club also takes great pride in its tradition in camogie. The club now has a strong nursery programme, which in turn has meant the club now fields football teams at under 7.5, under 9.5, under 11.5, under 13, under 15, Minor (under 17), under 19, Senior B and Senior. This nursery programme has now also allowed the club to develop its girls and ladies teams, who are now performing extremely well within the LGFA structure, teams are fielded at under 8, under 10, under 12, under 14, under 16, under 18 and Senior.

A relatively young under 16 team won the Armagh League and Championship in 2019, progressing through the Ulster Championship, where they were beaten by a very strong Burren team in the Final. The senior team is currently in Division 2 of the Armagh Senior Leagues.

History
The club, as Clan na Gael, was formed in 1922 in the Francis Street area following the demise of its long standing predecessor, The Michael Davitts. The club has been quite successful over the decades, bettered only in Armagh by Crossmaglen Rangers. Clan na Gael's height of dominance came in the 1970s, when the club won the Ulster Club Championship three times, and reached the final of the All-Ireland Club Championship, only to be beaten in a replay by University College, Dublin, who had a high number of inter-county players in their squad. However, recently championship success has been minimal at senior level, the last Armagh Senior Championship was won by the club was in 1994, but winning the Armagh Intermediate Championship in 2021, has allowed the club to return to Senior level.

The club came to its lowest point for a long time when it was relegated in 2004 from the Armagh All County League Division I to the All County League Division II, for only the second time in the history of the club (and the League). Things however improved with the club retaining ACL Division I status in 2005 and also having a run in the Armagh Championship, reaching the semi-final only to be beaten after a replay with Dromintee. In 2006 Clan na Gael was beaten by Crossmaglen in the final. They reached the 2008 quarter-finals but were beaten by Crossmaglen and again in 2009 by Armagh Harps after a replay.
Since 2013 the club was competing in the county's Intermediate Championship, returning to Senior Championship in 2021.

Achievements
 Armagh Senior Football Championship: (14) 
 1949, 1950, 1968, 1969, 1971, 1972, 1973, 1974, 1976, 1980, 1981, 1987, 1993, 1994
 Ulster Senior Club Football Championship: (3)
 1972, 1973, 1974
 All-Ireland Senior Club Football Championship: Runner-Up 1974
 Armagh Intermediate Football Championship: (1) 
 1965, 2020

Notable players
Jimmy Smyth, 1977 All Star, captained Armagh in the 1977 All-Ireland Senior Football Championship Final, later a BBC commentator
Diarmaid Marsden, Ulster Championship Winner, All-Ireland winner with Armagh in 2002, and an ex All-star

 Eamon Mc Mahon, Ulster Championship Winner, All-Ireland runner up with Armagh in 1953, ex Glentoran and Glasgow Celtic goalkeeper 
Hugh Kelly, Northern Ireland soccer international goalkeeper

References
 http://news.bbc.co.uk/sport1/hi/northern_ireland/gaelic_games/8264061.stm

External links
 Facebook

Gaelic games clubs in County Armagh
Gaelic football clubs in County Armagh
Lurgan